Harold Michael England  (born 2 December 1941) is a Welsh former footballer and manager.

Playing career
Playing as a central defender, England began his career at Blackburn Rovers in 1959, before moving to Tottenham Hotspur in July 1966, ultimately winning four major trophies: the FA Cup in 1967, the UEFA Cup in 1972, and the League Cup in 1971 and 1973.

He made 44 international appearances for Wales over twelve years, scoring 4 goals. He was the youngest ever Wales permanent captain for many years, until superseded by Aaron Ramsey in 2011.

Management career
He later managed the Wales national team from March 1980 to February 1988. His reign as manager was marked by a series of frustrations, as a team of limited resources, but with talented players such as Neville Southall, Ian Rush, Mark Hughes and Mickey Thomas, very narrowly missed out on qualification to a series of major tournaments, including the 1982, and 1986 FIFA World Cups. Perhaps most agonisingly, Wales only missed out on qualification for the 1984 UEFA European Championship by minutes when an injury-time winning goal by Ljubomir Radanović for Yugoslavia in the final game of qualifying group 4 against Bulgaria eliminated Wales.

England was sacked as Wales manager on 3 February 1988 after another initially promising attempt to qualify for the 1988 European Championships ended in failure. That was to be the final job he would ever have in football. He later managed a nursing home in North Wales, and then owned two nursing homes and ran his own timber business.

References

External links

1976 Seattle Sounders player profile
1979 Sounders profile – with stats
American stats

1941 births
Living people
People from Holywell, Flintshire
Sportspeople from Flintshire
Cleveland Force (original MISL) players
Welsh footballers
Welsh expatriate footballers
Wales under-23 international footballers
Wales international footballers
Welsh football managers
Wales national football team managers
Blackburn Rovers F.C. players
Tottenham Hotspur F.C. players
Cardiff City F.C. players
Major Indoor Soccer League (1978–1992) players
North American Soccer League (1968–1984) players
Seattle Sounders (1974–1983) players
Expatriate soccer players in the United States
Welsh expatriate sportspeople in the United States
English Football League players
Association football defenders
UEFA Cup winning players
FA Cup Final players